Brasiella is a genus of beetles in the family Cicindelidae, containing the following species:

 Brasiella acuniae (Mutchler, 1924)
 Brasiella adisi (Mandl, 1981)
 Brasiella amoenula (Chaudoir, 1854)
 Brasiella anulipes (W. Horn, 1897)
 Brasiella argentata (Fabricius, 1801)
 Brasiella argentinica (Mandl, 1963)
 Brasiella aureola (Klug, 1834)
 Brasiella balzani (W. Horn, 1899)
 Brasiella banghaasi (W. Horn, 1907)
 Brasiella brevipalpis (W. Horn, 1926)
 Brasiella brullei (Guerin, 1839)
 Brasiella chiapasi Br. van Nidek, 1980
 Brasiella chlorosticta (Kollar, 1836)
 Brasiella dolosula Rivalier, 1955
 Brasiella dolosulaffinis (Mandl, 1963)
 Brasiella dominicana (Mandl, 1982)
 Brasiella hamulipenis (W. Horn, 1938)
 Brasiella hemichrysea (Chevrolat, 1835)
 Brasiella horioni (Mandl, 1956)
 Brasiella insularis Br. van Nidek, 1980 
 Brasiella jolyi (Freitag, 1992)
 Brasiella mandli Br. van Nidek, 1978
 Brasiella maya Cassola & Sawada, 1990
 Brasiella mendicula Rivalier, 1955
 Brasiella minarum (Putzeys, 1845)
 Brasiella misella (Chaudoir, 1854)
 Brasiella nebulosa (Bates, 1874)
 Brasiella nigroreticulata (W. Horn, 1927)
 Brasiella obscurella (Klug, 1829)
 Brasiella obscurovata Sumlin, 1993
 Brasiella paranigroreticulata (Freitag & Barnes, 1989)
 Brasiella pretiosa (Dokhtouroff, 1882)
 Brasiella rivalieri (Mandl, 1963)
 Brasiella rotundatodilatata (W. Horn, 1925)
 Brasiella speculans (Bates, 1890)
 Brasiella sphaerodera Rivalier, 1955
 Brasiella stamatovi (Sumlin, 1979)
 Brasiella staudingeria (W. Horn, 1915)
 Brasiella tippmanni (Mandl, 1963)
 Brasiella umbrogemmata (W. Horn, 1906)
 Brasiella venezuelensis (Mandl, 1973)
 Brasiella venustula (Gory, 1833)
 Brasiella viridicollis (Dejean, 1831)
 Brasiella wickhami (W. Horn, 1903)
 Brasiella wiesneri Mandl, 1981

References

Cicindelidae